Geologica Belgica is a peer-reviewed open access scholarly journal publishing papers concerning all aspects of the earth sciences, with a particular emphasis on the regional geology of Belgium, North West Europe and central Africa. It is published on the Portail de Publication de Périodiques Scientifiques (PoPuPS) platform operated by the University of Liège Library. The current executive editor is Annick Anceau.

Abstracting and indexing 
The journal is abstracted and indexed in:

References

External links 
 

Open access journals
Publications established in 1998
English-language journals
Geology journals